This is a list of winners and nominees for the BAFTA Award for Best Production Design, formerly known as Best Art Direction (1965–1976), which is presented to production designers (including art directors and set decorators), given out by the British Academy of Film and Television Arts since 1965.

Winners and nominees

1960s
Best British Art Direction – Black and White

Best British Art Direction – Colour

Best Art Direction

1970s

Best Production Design

1980s

1990s

2000s

2010s

2020s

See also
 Saturn Award for Best Production Design
 Academy Award for Best Production Design
 Critics' Choice Movie Award for Best Production Design
 Art Directors Guild Award for Excellence in Production Design for a Period Film
 Art Directors Guild Award for Excellence in Production Design for a Fantasy Film
 Art Directors Guild Award for Excellence in Production Design for a Contemporary Film

References

British Academy Film Awards
Awards for best art direction